Sir George Samuel Jenkinson, 11th Baronet (27 September 1817 – 19 January 1892), was a British Conservative politician.

Background
Jenkinson was the son of the Right Reverend John Jenkinson, Bishop of St David's, and Frances Augusta Pechell, daughter of Augustus Pechell. Prime Minister Robert Jenkinson, 2nd Earl of Liverpool, was his first cousin once removed. In 1855 he succeeded his uncle as eleventh Baronet. He died in Eastwood House, Falfield, on 19 January 1892 and was buried in a vault in St George's Church, Falfield.

Political career
He served as High Sheriff of Gloucestershire for 1862. He then unsuccessfully contested Wiltshire North in 1865 and Nottingham in 1866. In 1868 he was successfully returned for the former constituency, a seat he held until 1880.

Family
Jenkinson married Emily Sophia Lyster, daughter of Anthony Lyster, in 1845. They had two sons and three daughters. He died in January 1892, aged 74, and was succeeded in the baronetcy by his eldest and only surviving son, George. Lady Jenkinson only survived him by a month and died in February 1892. She is best known for having founded the Lady Jenkinson Thalberg Scholarship, in honour of her violin teacher Sigismond Thalberg.

References

Sources

Falfield Village, community website
Biography

External links

Photograph of Sir George Jenkinson, Bt

1817 births
1892 deaths
Baronets in the Baronetage of England
Conservative Party (UK) MPs for English constituencies
High Sheriffs of Gloucestershire
UK MPs 1868–1874
UK MPs 1874–1880